The 2016 ANZ Championship season was the ninth and last season of the ANZ Championship. The season began on 1 April 2016 and concluded on 4 July 2016. Southern Steel were minor premiers. With a team coached by Roselee Jencke, captained by Laura Geitz and featuring Romelda Aiken, Clare McMeniman and Kim Ravaillion, Firebirds won the Australian Conference, the Challenge Trophy and the overall championship. Firebirds became the first and only team to retain the title. In a repeat of 2015, Firebirds defeated New South Wales Swifts in both the Australian Conference Final and the Grand Final.

Transfers

Head coaches and captains

Notes
 In June 2016, Michelle Den Dekker was replaced as  head coach by Kristy Keppich-Birrell.

Pre-season
On 5 March 2016, Melbourne Vixens played Adelaide Thunderbirds in a pre-season  practice match at Wanganui Park Secondary College. The match was organised by Netball Victoria and the Greater Shepparton City Council. During the match, Vixens' Tegan Philip suffered an anterior cruciate ligament injury which ended her season.

Between 18 and 20 March 2016, two separate three-day events were held simultaneously. Northern Mystics hosted Waikato Bay of Plenty Magic, Southern Steel, Adelaide Thunderbirds and Queensland Firebirds at The Trusts Arena while New South Wales Swifts hosted Melbourne Vixens, West Coast Fever, Central Pulse and Mainland Tactix at Sydney Olympic Park Sports Centre. The two events experimented with a three-point scoring zone and rolling interchanges. Vixens defeated Fever in the final of the Sydney tournament.

Regular season

Round 1

Round 2

Round 3

Round 4 ANZAC Round

Round 5

Round 6

Round 7

Round 8

Round 9

Round 10

Round 11

Round 12

Round 13

Round 14

Final standings

Challenge Trophy
 began their defence of the Challenge Trophy in Round 1 against Mainland Tactix. Firebirds were unbeaten at home throughout the season and, as a result, retained the Challenge Trophy.

Finals series

Australian Conference
Elimination Final

Conference Final

New Zealand Conference 
Elimination Final

 
Conference Final

Semi-finals

Grand Final

Award winners

ANZ Championship awards

Notes
 Madison Robinson was the MVP player in the Australian Conference and Jhaniele Fowler-Reid was the MVP player in the New Zealand Conference.

All Star Team

Australian Netball Awards

New Zealand Netball Awards

Media coverage
All 72 games were broadcast live on Fox Sports (Australia) and Sky Sport (New Zealand). Sunday 12.00pm (AEST) fixtures were simulcast live on Fox Sports, Network Ten in Sydney, Melbourne, Brisbane and Adelaide, and by One in Perth. The season had a cumulative broadcast audience of 4.9m.

References

 
2016
2016 in New Zealand netball
2016 in Australian netball